This list of Grinnell College alumni includes graduates, non-graduate former students, and current students of Grinnell College, Iowa, US.

Academia and research

Arts

Business and finance

Entertainment

Government, law, and public policy

Journalists and media personalities

Literature, writing, and translation

Medicine and surgery

Military

Social reforms

Sports

Technology

References

 
Grinnell College alumni